Hazlehead Academy, formerly known as Central School then Aberdeen Academy, is a comprehensive secondary school in Aberdeen, Scotland. It has four main feeder primary schools, Airyhall Primary School, Fernielea Primary School, Hazlehead Primary School and Kingsford Primary School - in addition  to this, pupils who have been part of a Gaelic unit at Aberdeen's Gilcomstoun Primary School can transfer to Hazlehead, which offers Gaelic as part of the curriculum.

History

Hazlehead Academy is a six-year comprehensive school on the western edges of Aberdeen, adjacent to Hazlehead Park. It has a history stretching back for over 100 years. In 1901, Aberdeen School Board built Central School on the corner of Schoolhill and Belmont Street, on a site now occupied by a shopping centre named The Academy. In 1954, the school was renamed Aberdeen Academy. When the school closed, the pupils were moved to the new Hazlehead Academy.

Hazlehead Academy was officially opened by Queen Elizabeth II on 7 October 1970. Plans were laid towards the end of the 1950s. The education committee at the time had under consideration the reorganisation of the existing Secondary provision of 3 Senior Secondary schools and a number of Junior Secondary schools into 10 co-educational comprehensives. Hazlehead Academy would become one of these senior secondaries and then a comprehensive school.

Following the move to the new site in Groat's Road, the new buildings were officially opened by Queen Elizabeth II on 7 October 1970. The current head teacher is Jim Purdie who took up post in August 2016. The school roll is around 800 pupils.

In 2012, the school was selected as the Aberdeen base for the Scottish Football Association's Performance Schools, a system devised to support the development of the best young talented footballers across the country (there are seven such schools across Scotland). As of 2018, the dedicated coach for the young players at Hazlehead is Stuart Glennie.

Houses
In recent years there were five houses; Bruce (Blue), Craigievar (Green), Dunecht (Yellow), Greyfriars (White) and Marischal (Red). In 2010, Bruce house was dissolved with pupils being split among the remaining four houses but was reinstated in 2020.

Notable former pupils

 Graham Davidson: racing driver, 2019 British Champion - Aston Martin - GT3 driver 
 Stuart Armstrong: professional footballer, currently playing for Southampton F.C.
 Fraser Fyvie: professional footballer, currently playing for Cove Rangers F.C.
 Lee Mair: professional footballer, notably formerly of Aberdeen F.C. and St Mirren F.C.
 Derek Rae: football commentator, currently working for BT Sport and ESPN
 David Rowson: professional footballer, notably formerly of Aberdeen F.C. and Partick Thistle F.C.
 Hugh Robertson: professional footballer, notably formerly of Ross County F.C. and Hartlepool United F.C.
 Neale Cooper: professional footballer, notably of Aberdeen F.C. and former manager of Hartlepool United F.C.
 Rachel Corsie: professional footballer, currently playing for Utah Royals FC and Scotland women's national football team
 Laura Main: singer and actress. Star of BBC One's hit drama Call the Midwife
 Richie Ramsay: professional golfer and former champion of U.S. Amateur

References

External links

Secondary schools in Aberdeen
Educational institutions established in 1963
1963 establishments in Scotland
Youth football in Scotland